High Life, The High Life, or Highlife may refer to:

Film, television and theatre
 The High Life (1960 film), a German film directed by Julien Duvivier
 High Life (2009 film), a Canadian adaptation of the play by Lee MacDougall (see below)
 High Life (2018 film), a science fiction film directed by Claire Denis
 The High Life (American TV series), a 1996 American sitcom
 The High Life (British TV series), a 1994–1995 British sitcom
 The Gay Life, a 1961 musical retitled The High Life for a 2005 revival
 High Life, a 1996 play by Lee MacDougall

Music
 Highlife, a musical genre that originated in Ghana
 High Life Music, a Canadian record label

Albums
 High Life (Brian Tarquin album) or the title song, 2001
 High Life (Frankie Miller album) or the title song, 1974
 High Life (Wayne Shorter album) or the title song, 1995
 High Life (Eno and Hyde album), by Brian Eno and Karl Hyde, 2014
 High Life!, by Exit-13, 2007
 High Life, by Gugun Blues Shelter, 2015
 Highlife (Randy Weston album), 1963
 Highlife (Sonny Sharrock album) or the title song, 1990
 The High Life (The Puppini Sisters album), 2016
 The High Life (Reef the Lost Cauze album), 2001
 The High Life, a mixtape by Mac Miller, 2009

Songs
 "High Life" (song), by Modern Romance, 1983
 "High Life", by Daft Punk from Discovery, 2001
 "High Life", by London Grammar from If You Wait, 2013
 "High Life", by Mono from Formica Blues, 1997
 "Highlife" (song), by Cypress Hill, 2000
 "Highlife", by the Dandy Warhols from Why You So Crazy, 2019
 "The High Life" (song), by Colt Ford and Chase Rice, 2014
 "The High Life", by In Fear and Faith from Imperial, 2010

Other
 High Life de Belgique, a Belgian publisher
 Highlife (cellular automaton)
 Miller High Life, an American beer
 High Life, a 2010 novel by Matthew Stokoe
 High Life, an in-flight magazine for British Airways

See also
 Low Life (disambiguation)